Baron Gábor Kemény de Magyargyerőmonostor (9 July 1830 – 23 October 1888) was a Hungarian politician, who served as Minister of Agriculture, Industry and Trade between 1878–1882 and as Minister of Public Works and Transport from 1882 to 1886. He was the son of Dénes Kemény, the secretary of state of the Interior Ministry during the Hungarian Revolution of 1848. Gábor Kemény was a corresponding member of the Hungarian Academy of Sciences since 1863 and served as chairman of the Hungarian Historical Society from 1887 until his death. He was a member of the Diet of Hungary from 1866.

References
 Magyar Életrajzi Lexikon
Baron Gábor Kemény 1830–1888. in: Vasárnapi Újság XXXV. 1888/44, pp. 721–722	

1830 births
1888 deaths
People from Aiud
Agriculture ministers of Hungary
Public Works and Transport ministers of Hungary
Gabor